This is a list of mountains in Montenegro.

List of mountains 
Bijela gora
Bioč
Bjelasica
Bolj
Bogićevica
Crna planina
Durmitor
Golija
Gradina
Hajla
Ključ
Komovi
Kovač
Lisa
Lisac
Lovćen
Lola
Lukavica
Lebršnik
Ljubišnja
Maganik
Maglić
Mokra Gora
Mokra planina
Možura
Njegoš
Ostroška Greda
Obzir
Orjen
Prekornica
Pivska planina
Accursed Mountains
Rumija
Sinjavina
Somina
Stožac
Visitor
Vojnik
Volujak
Vučje 
Vrmac
Zeletin
Žijevo
Žljeb
Žurim

Mountain peaks over 2,000 m

See also 
 Geography of Montenegro

References 

 
Montenegro
Mountains
Montenegro